Dyemus is a genus of beetles in the family Cerambycidae, containing the following species:

 Dyemus basicristatus Breuning, 1938
 Dyemus puncticollis Pascoe, 1864
 Dyemus purpureopulcher (Gilmour, 1948)
 Dyemus undulatolineatus Breuning, 1938

References

Apomecynini
Cerambycidae genera